Sharon Lynn (born D'Auvergne Sharon Lindsay, April 9, 1901 – May 26, 1963) was an American actress and singer. She began playing in silent films but enjoyed her biggest success in the early sound years of motion pictures before fading away in the mid-1930s. She is perhaps best known for portraying Lola Marcel, the villainess in the Laurel and Hardy comedy feature, Way Out West.

Early years
Lynn was born in Weatherford, Texas. She moved to Fullerton, California, at a young age and was educated in Fullerton's public schools. Later she was a student at the Paramount Motion Picture School.

Career
After appearing in several silent films, Lynn debuted in talking pictures in  Speakeasy (1929). After her best known film role opposite Laurel and Hardy in Way Out West, she made only one more film, a musical made in Britain, Thistledown, and then retired from the screen.

Personal life
On January 16, 1932, in Yuma, Arizona, Lynn married film executive Benjamin Glazer who died in 1956. She was also wed to John Sershen.

Death
On May 26, 1963, Lynn died at Hollywood Presbyterian Hospital, at age 62 of multiple sclerosis.

Partial filmography

 Curlytop (1924)
The Coward (1927)
Clancy's Kosher Wedding (1927)
 Tom's Gang (1927)
 The Cherokee Kid (1927)
Aflame in the Sky (1927)
 Jake the Plumber (1927)
None but the Brave (1928)
Son of the Golden West (1928)
Give and Take (1928)
Red Wine (1928)
Speakeasy (1929)
Fox Movietone Follies of 1929 (1929)
The One Women Idea (1929)
Happy Days (1929)
Sunny Side Up (1929)
Let's Go Places (1930)
Up the River (1930)
Crazy That Way (1930)
Lightnin' (1930)
Men on Call (1931)
Too Many Cooks (1931)
The Big Broadcast (1932)
Discarded Lovers  (1932)
Enter Madame (1935)
Go into Your Dance (1935)
Way Out West (1937)
Thistledown (1938)

References

External links

 
 
Portrait gallery (University of Washington, Sayre collection)

1901 births
1963 deaths
American film actresses
Hal Roach Studios actors
People from Weatherford, Texas
Actresses from Texas
Singers from Texas
20th-century American actresses
20th-century American singers
Neurological disease deaths in California
Deaths from multiple sclerosis